New Strasburg is an unincorporated community in Fairfield County, in the U.S. state of Ohio.

The community derives its name from the French city of Strasbourg (German: Strassburg).

References

Unincorporated communities in Fairfield County, Ohio
Unincorporated communities in Ohio